Dmitri Vyacheslavovich Kvartalnov (Дмитрий Вячеславович Квартальнов; born March 25, 1966 in Voskresensk, Soviet Union) is a retired professional ice hockey player who played 112 games in the National Hockey League, all with the Boston Bruins. He had at least a point in his first 14 NHL games, which stood as the NHL record for longest point streak from the beginning of a career, until November 16, 2007, when Evgeni Malkin surpassed this milestone, scoring at least one point in each of his first 15 games. This streak lasted from October 8 to November 12, 1992 during which time he scored 12 goals and 10 assists.

Playing career
Kvartalnov had a career which lasted for 25 years, during which he played in North America for the San Diego Gulls of the IHL, the Boston Bruins of the NHL and its minor league affiliate, the Providence Bruins. Kvartalnov's career in Europe consisted of Adler Mannheim in Germany, Jokerit in Finland, HC Ambri-Piotta in Switzerland, Klagenfurter AC in Austria, and teams like Khimik Voskresensk and Ak Bars Kazan in Russia. Kvartalnov retired from play in 2008.

Coaching career
He had been coaching Severstal Cherepovets in 2009–2012, HC Sibir Novosibirsk in 2012–2014, HC CSKA Moscow in 2014–2017 (Gagarin Cup semifinal in 2015 and final in 2016), Lokomotiv Yaroslavl (2017–2019) and Ak Bars Kazan (2019–2022).

Awards and achievements
1989–90: Soviet Championship League most points
1991–92: James Gatschene Memorial Trophy
1991–92: Leo Lamoureux Memorial Trophy
1991–92: Gary F. Longman Memorial Trophy
1995–96: NDA most assists (38)
1999–2000: SM-liiga silver medal

Career statistics

Regular season and playoffs

International

References

External links
 

1966 births
Adler Mannheim players
Ak Bars Kazan players
Boston Bruins draft picks
Boston Bruins players
HC Ambrì-Piotta players
HC Khimik Voskresensk players
Jokerit players
EC KAC players
Krylya Sovetov Moscow players
Living people
National Hockey League first-round draft picks
People from Voskresensk
Providence Bruins players
Russian ice hockey coaches
Russian ice hockey right wingers
San Diego Gulls (IHL) players
Severstal Cherepovets players
Soviet ice hockey right wingers
Sportspeople from Moscow Oblast